Vladimir Kramar (born April 14, 1993) is a Russian-Kazkhstani professional ice hockey goalie currently playing for Nomad Nur-Sultan in the Supreme Hockey League (VHL). He has formerly played 1 game with parent affiliate, the then Barys Astana of the Kontinental Hockey League (KHL).

References

External links

Living people
1993 births
Barys Nur-Sultan players
Buran Voronezh players
Nomad Astana players
Russian ice hockey goaltenders
Sportspeople from Omsk
Snezhnye Barsy players